Zoziya Kardava (born 15 July 2001) is a Georgian tennis player.

Kardava has a career-high singles ranking by the Women's Tennis Association (WTA) of 817, achieved on 17 September 2018. She also has a career-high WTA doubles ranking of 862, achieved on 14 February 2022. Kardava has won one ITF singles title and one ITF doubles title.

Kardava represents Georgia in Fed Cup competition.

ITF finals

Singles (1–0)

Doubles (1–2)

References

External links
 
 
 

2001 births
Living people
Female tennis players from Georgia (country)
Sportspeople from Tula, Russia